Acinetobacter puyangensis is a Gram-negative, rod-shaped and non-motile bacterium from the genus Acinetobacter which has been isolated from the bark of the tree Populus x euramericana.

References

External links
Type strain of Acinetobacter puyangensis at BacDive -  the Bacterial Diversity Metadatabase
	

Moraxellaceae
Bacteria described in 2013